Gnathodentex is a genus of emperor fish. It is monotypic, being represented by a single species, the goldspot seabream (Gnathodentex aureolineatus), also known as the striped large-eye bream.

Description
The goldspot seabream is a medium-sized fish which can grow up to a maximum length of 30 cm, however the commonly observed size is 20 cm. Its body is compressed laterally, the snout is pointed and the tail is forked. 
The background coloration is silver-grey with golden horizontal lines on the sides, these later are topped by dark horizontal lines.
Its fins have pinkish shades, a yellow mustache-like line overcomes the upper lip, the junction of the pectoral fins to the body is marked with yellow and also along the outer edge of the operculum.→
A golden yellow spot located on the back at the termination of the dorsal fin is a hallmark of this species.
In proportion to body size, the eyes are quite large.

Distribution & habitat
Gnathodentex aureolineatus is present in tropical and subtropical waters of the Indo-Pacific area from the eastern coast of Africa to the Pacific Ocean's islands, Hawaii excluded. 
The goldspot seabream likes the proximity of reefs which slopes are external or not.

Biology
The striped large-eye bream has a nocturnal activity, during daytime, it can be seen alone or in large to small compact group close by the reef.
At night, they disperse to feed. Its diet consists of small prey such as benthic invertebrates like various kind of crustaceans and gastropods, also sometimes small fish.

References

Lethrinidae
Fish described in 1873
Monotypic ray-finned fish genera